Anatoli Ivanovich Ushanov (born 2 January 1950 - 30 September 2017) was a Russian football coach and a former player.

Playing career

Coaching career
He worked as a coach in FC Dinamo Leningrad, FC Dinamo Sankt-Peterburg, FC Petrotrest Saint Petersburg, FC Torpedo-MAZ Minsk and JK Sillamäe Kalev (head coach) in 2009. 2010–2011 he was the assistant coach of the JK Sillamäe Kalev.

References

1950 births
2017 deaths
Soviet footballers
Russian football managers
Soviet football managers
JK Sillamäe Kalev managers
Expatriate football managers in Belarus
Association football goalkeepers
FC Neman Grodno players
Expatriate football managers in Estonia